Cheep may refer to:

 Bird vocalization
 Cheep, a 1917 musical revue at the Vaudeville Theatre
 CH-33P, an astromech droid in the final season of Star Wars: The Clone Wars

See also
 Cheap (disambiguation)